Timotej Šille (born 22 June 1995) is a Slovak professional ice hockey player. 

Šille originally made his professional debut in the Slovak Extraliga debut playing with HK 36 Skalica during the 2012–13 Slovak Extraliga season. He was also member of Slovakia U18 national team at 2013 World Junior U18 Championships in Sochi, Russia. 

In the 2013-14 season he won the President's cup in the QMJHL league and participated in 2014 Memorial Cup. 

He is currently living in Drummondville, QC.

References

External links

1995 births
Living people
Fehérvár AV19 players
HK Nitra players
HC Nové Zámky players
Slovak ice hockey centres
HK 36 Skalica players
Val-d'Or Foreurs players
Ice hockey people from Bratislava
Slovak expatriate ice hockey players in Canada
Slovak expatriate ice hockey players in Sweden
Slovak expatriate ice hockey players in Germany
Expatriate ice hockey players in Hungary
Expatriate ice hockey players in Austria
Slovak expatriate sportspeople in Hungary
Slovak expatriate sportspeople in Austria
Slovak expatriate ice hockey players in Finland